Prior to the 2019 United Kingdom general election, various organisations carried out opinion polling to gauge voting intentions. Results of such polls are displayed in this list. Most of the pollsters listed are members of the British Polling Council (BPC) and abide by its disclosure rules. Opinion polling about attitudes to the leaders of various political parties can be found in a separate article.

The date range for these opinion polls is from the previous general election, held on 8 June 2017, to the 2019 general election. The election was held on 12 December 2019.

Most opinion polls do not cover Northern Ireland, since its 18 seats were not contested by the political parties standing for election in the rest of the United Kingdom.

Graphical summaries 
The chart below depicts opinion polls conducted for the next United Kingdom general election using a 15-poll moving average. As discussed below, most of these polls do not include Northern Ireland. The larger circles at the end represent the actual results of the election.

National poll results 
Poll results are listed in the table below in reverse chronological order. Most pollsters only include responses from within Great Britain, excluding Northern Ireland. However, some, such as Survation, do include Northern Ireland. The table below indicates whether a poll is Great Britain (GB)-only or United Kingdom (UK)-wide.

The campaigning period officially began on 6 November 2019.

The various polls use a variety of methodologies.  For example, in Kantar and Ipsos MORI polls, Change UK and the Brexit Party were spontaneous responses and not prompted by the pollster. In YouGov polls before June 2019, only the Conservatives, Labour, and Liberal Democrats were prompted, the names of other parties being listed when "other" was selected. YouGov polls conducted since June 2019 prompt for both the Greens and the Brexit Party, alongside the earlier list. BMG polls also use two-stage questions in which the Conservatives, Labour, Liberal Democrats, the Brexit Party, the Greens, SNP, and Plaid Cymru are included on the initial prompt and the remaining parties provided after "another party" is selected. Prior to August 2019, BMG did not prompt the Brexit Party and the Greens initially.

As the parties standing for each seat became known (including the 11 November announcement that the Brexit Party would not be contesting the 317 seats won by the Conservatives in 2017) the major pollsters began listing only those standing in a respondent's constituency as options.

2019

2018

2017

Seat predictions 
Most polls are reported in terms of the overall popular vote share, and the pollsters do not typically project how these shares would equate to numbers of seats in the House of Commons. Other organisations including Electoral Calculus make rolling projections based on an aggregate of publicly available polls.

A small number of large polls have been carried out in order to run multilevel regression with poststratification (MRP) models, which output predictions for each constituency.

Nations and Regions polling

Scotland

Wales

Northern Ireland

London

North East England

North West England

Yorkshire and the Humber

East Midlands

West Midlands

East of England

South East England

South West England

Multiple constituencies 
Number Cruncher Politics polled adults living in the 60 English marginal constituencies with a Labour or Conservative majority of less than five per cent. 2017 results are for the same 60 seats.

Constituency polling 
Note that where the client is a political party, constituency level polling may be particularly susceptible to publication bias.

East Midlands

Gedling

East of England

Cambridge

South Cambridgeshire

South East Cambridgeshire

South West Hertfordshire

London

Carshalton and Wallington

Chelsea and Fulham

Chingford and Woodford Green

Cities of London and Westminster

Finchley and Golders Green

Hendon

Kensington

Putney

Richmond Park

Wimbledon

North East England

Berwick-upon-Tweed

Stockton South

North West England

Southport

Workington

South East England

Beaconsfield

Esher and Walton

Guildford

Portsmouth South

Reading West

Wokingham

South West England

Bath

North East Somerset

Wales

Wrexham

West Midlands

Warwick and Leamington

Yorkshire and the Humber

Great Grimsby

See also 

 Leadership approval opinion polling for the 2019 United Kingdom general election
 Opinion polling for the next United Kingdom general election
 Opinion polling for the 2021 Scottish Parliament election
 Opinion polling for the 2021 Senedd election
 Opinion polling for the 2022 Northern Ireland Assembly election
 Opinion polling on the United Kingdom's membership of the European Union (2016–2020)
 Opinion polling for the 2019 European Parliament election in the United Kingdom
 List of United Kingdom by-elections (2010–present)

Notes

References

External links 
Britain Elects Westminster voting intention archive (1997–present)
Britain Elects Scottish Westminster voting intention archive (2015–present) 
Britain Elects Welsh Westminster voting intention archive (2010–present)
Results of the 2017 general election

Opinion polling for United Kingdom general elections
Opinion polling for United Kingdom votes in the 2010s